Perry Rosenthal (September 2, 1933 - March 3, 2018), was a Canadian-born American eye surgeon and professor of ophthalmology, known for his work in the development of the first gas-permeable scleral contact lens.

Education  
Following his graduation from McGill University Medical School in May 1958, Rosenthal completed his internship at Montreal General Hospital in 1959.  From  1959 until April 1960, he completed a basic science course in ophthalmology at Harvard Medical School, Boston, Massachusetts.  He was a resident in ophthalmology at the Massachusetts Eye and Ear Infirmary from 1960 to 1963, then joined the infirmary staff.
From 1963 to 1998, he was in private practice,  and a staff surgeon at the Massachusetts Eye and Ear Infirmary.  He was then named to the infirmary's courtesy staff, and, since 2013, was an emeritus member. Rosenthal was a part-time Assistant Clinical Professor in Ophthalmology at Harvard Medical School since 1984.

Academic work
As a resident at  Massachusetts Eye and Ear Infirmary, Rosenthal founded the hospital's contact lens clinic. He subsequently became a co-founder of Polymer Technology Inc., which developed Boston Lens products, including a rigid gas-permeable plastic that allowed the corneas to breathe normally through the contact lenses. The firm   was subsequently acquired by Bausch & Lomb, of which Rosenthal became a director. In 1986, he developed a practical, gas-permeable scleral contact lens to treat and restore vision of eyes with many corneal diseases, which ave been widely adopted in clinical practice, He has also published on oculofacial pain, and  dry-eye disease.

In 1992, he created the non-profit Boston Foundation for Sight to provide these devices to those in need, regardless of their ability to pay. He remained   president until 2012. In 2013, he founded the non-profit Boston EyePain Foundation, in Chestnut Hill, Massachusetts.

Honors and awards
1987 – Trailblazer's Award, Contact Lens Manufacturers Association (CLMA)
1994 – Joseph Dallos Award (CLMA),  "outstanding contribution to the development and advancement of the contact lens industry   in memory of the Hungarian-born British ophthalmologist Josef Dallos, a pioneer in the development of the first contact lenses.
2002 – Tech Laureate,  by the Tech Museum of Innovation, San Jose, California, for technology benefiting humanity.
2007 – Founders Award: American Academy of Optometry
2012 – Dr. Donald R. Korb Award for Excellence, annual meeting of the American Optometric Association

Publications

His most cited publications are:

Romero-Rangel, T., Stavrou, P., Cotter, J., Rosenthal, P., Foster, S. "Gas permeable scleral lens therapy in ocular surface disease." American Journal of Ophthalmology, 2000; 130: 25–32. Cited 153 times, according to Google Scholar.  
Rosenthal, P., Cotter, J.M, Baum, J. "Treatment of persistent epithelial defect with extended wear of a fluid-ventilated gas permeable scleral contact lens." American Journal of Ophthalmology, 2000; 130: 33-41  Cited 98 times, according to GoogleScholar. Online
 Rosenthal, P., Croteau, A. "Fluid-Ventilated, gas-permeable scleral contact lens is an effective option for managing severe ocular surface disease and many corneal disorders that would otherwise require penetrating keratoplasty." Eye & Contact Lens, 2005; 31 (3) (130-134).

References

External links 
 http://www.bostoneyepain.org/

American ophthalmologists
McGill University Faculty of Medicine alumni
1933 births
American people of Canadian descent
Harvard Medical School alumni
Living people